Joseph Arthur Shadbolt (1 August 1874–1967) was an English footballer who played in the Football League for Oldham Athletic.

References

1874 births
1967 deaths
English footballers
Association football forwards
English Football League players
Southport F.C. players
Oldham Athletic A.F.C. players
Hyde United F.C. players